Tropimerus hovorei is a species of beetle in the family Cerambycidae. It was described by Giesbert in 1987.

References

Elaphidiini
Beetles described in 1987